Zara Anne Elizabeth Tindall   (née Phillips; born 15 May 1981) is a British equestrian, an Olympian, and the daughter of Anne, Princess Royal, and Captain Mark Phillips. She is a granddaughter of Queen Elizabeth II, a niece of King Charles III and 20th in the line of succession to the British throne.

Tindall won the Eventing World Championship in Aachen in 2006. That same year, she was voted 2006 BBC Sports Personality of the Year by the public. In 2012, she carried an Olympic flame at Cheltenham Racecourse on her horse Toytown. As a member of the Great Britain Eventing Team, she won a silver medal at the 2012 Summer Olympics, presented to her by her mother. She married rugby union player Mike Tindall in 2011.

Early life and education
Zara Anne Elizabeth Phillips was born on 15 May 1981 at 8:15 pm in the Lindo Wing of St Mary's Hospital, London. She was christened on 27 July 1981, at Windsor Castle; her first name was suggested by her uncle, Charles, the then Prince of Wales. Her godparents are her maternal uncle, the Duke of York; the Countess of Lichfield; Helen, Lady Stewart, the wife of Sir Jackie Stewart; Andrew Parker Bowles; and Hugh Thomas. She has an elder brother, Peter, and two younger half-sisters, Felicity Wade (née Tonkin; from her father's affair with Heather Tonkin) and Stephanie Phillips, from her father's second marriage to Sandy Pflueger.

Phillips attended Beaudesert Park School in Stroud, Gloucestershire, and Port Regis School in Shaftesbury, Dorset, before following other members of the royal family in attending Gordonstoun School in Moray, Scotland. During her schooldays, Phillips excelled at many sporting activities, representing her schools in hockey, athletics, and gymnastics. She later studied at the University of Exeter and qualified as a physiotherapist.

Equestrianism

After university, Phillips began to pursue an equestrian career, in the footsteps of her parents. In June 2003, she announced that she had secured a sponsorship deal with Cantor Index, a leading company in spread betting, to help cover the costs of her equestrian career. She finished as runner-up at Burghley Horse Trials in 2003 in her first four-star event. Tindall missed the 2004 Summer Olympics in Athens after her horse suffered an injury during training.

Riding her horse Toytown, Tindall collected individual and team gold medals at the 2005 European Eventing Championship in Blenheim, and individual gold and team silver medals at the 2006 FEI World Equestrian Games in Aachen, Germany, making her the reigning Eventing World Champion until 2010. The same year after her win in Germany, she was voted BBC Sports Personality of the Year by the British viewing public (an award her mother won in 1971). She was also appointed Member of the Order of the British Empire (MBE) in the 2007 New Year Honours for her services to equestrianism. Despite winning team gold at the 2007 European Eventing Championships in Italy, she failed to defend her individual title in the show-jumping phase of the competition.

The British Olympic Association announced that Tindall would ride Toytown for the British equestrian team at the Beijing Olympic Games 2008 in Hong Kong. However, Toytown was injured during training and she was forced to withdraw from the team.

On 25 October 2008, Tindall fell from her horse, Tsunami II, at the 15th fence of a cross-country event at Pau, France, and broke her right collarbone. The horse broke her neck after she tipped over the hedge and was put down. In 2009, Tindall announced she was designing her own range of equestrian clothing for Musto Outdoor Clothing. The range is named ZP176 after the team number she was given when she first represented her country. The range was officially launched in July 2010.

On 11 June 2012, Tindall was announced as a member of the British Equestrian team for the 2012 London Olympic Games. She competed in the Olympics on High Kingdom and won a silver medal in the team event. Her mother, Princess Anne, presented her medal. Tindall finished second at Luhmühlen Horse Trials 2013, on her top horse High Kingdom. At the World Equestrian Games in 2014, Tindall and High Kingdom were part of the British team that won team silver.

Tindall stopped using her maiden name, Phillips, in March 2016. She competed for the first time as Zara Tindall during her unsuccessful attempt to qualify for the 2016 Rio Olympic Games. In 2017, she won the third place at the Kentucky Three-Day Event on High Kingdom, before he retired from the sport in 2018. In November 2019, she was appointed to the non-executive role of director of the Cheltenham Racecourse and began her role in January 2020. In August 2020, Tindall was selected for her first appearance on the British Team competing at the prestigious FEI Nations Cup in Le Pin au Haras, France. In October 2021, Tindall competed in Maryland 5 Star at Fair Hill and finished at 11th place with score 30.4, riding Gleadhill House Stud Ltd's 12-year-old horse named Class Affair. In May 2022, Tindall won the advanced class at the Chatsworth Horse Trials, riding Class Affair.

Charity work
Tindall frequently supports and attends events for various charitable causes, mainly revolving around spinal injuries, equestrianism, and children's causes. In 2005, she auctioned one of her evening gowns, worn at the London premiere of the film Seabiscuit, to raise money for tsunami relief. She also undertook a visit to New Zealand in her role as patron of The Catwalk Trust. From 1998 to 2005, she served as the president of Club 16–24, a group which encourages young people to take an interest in racing. She is associated with Inspire, a Salisbury-based medical research charity which helps to improve the quality of life of people with spinal cord injuries. She is patron of Lucy Air Ambulance for Children, which is the UK's first dedicated air transfer service to fly critically ill infants and children to hospitals for urgent care.

Tindall has appeared at events for The Caudwell Charitable Trust, which targets children with special needs, disabilities and serious illnesses. In 2006, she took part in a special charity day for Cantor Index, whose staff were killed in the 11 September 2001 attacks. In 2007, she became patron of the Mark Davies Injured Riders Fund. To help with Sport Relief 2008, she posed for a portrait by artist Jack Vettriano. In 2009, she attended a celebrity poker tournament in Monaco in aid of Darfur, Sudan. In October 2010, she attended a celebrity poker tournament in London, in aid of Cancer Research UK, of which she is patron. In 2011, she auctioned another evening gown in aide of the Christchurch earthquake appeal, raising £22,000. In 2013, she visited the Stroud Maternity Ward to celebrate their 60th anniversary. In 2014, Tindall lent her support to the #bringbackourgirls campaign. In April 2020, Tindall participated in an Equestrian Relief initiative that would provide increased personal protective equipment for National Health Service workers.

Other activities
In June 2015, Tindall launched a line of jewellery collection, named "Zara Phillips Collection", in collaboration with Australian designer John Calleija. The equestrian themed collection featured the Saddle Suite and the Coronet Suite, with the prices ranging from $6,250 to $44,000.

On 17 September 2022, during the period of official mourning for Queen Elizabeth II, Tindall joined her brother and six cousins, to mount a 15-minute vigil, around the coffin of the Queen, as it lay in state at Westminster Hall. On 19 September, with her husband Mike and daughter Mia, she joined other family members at the state funeral.

Personal life

Zara Phillips met rugby union player Mike Tindall, who was playing for the England national team, during their Rugby World Cup-winning campaign in Australia in 2003. On 21 December 2010, Buckingham Palace announced their engagement. As was at that time required by the Royal Marriages Act 1772, the Queen gave her consent to the marriage in a meeting of the Privy Council on 10 May 2011. Mike Tindall proposed to her with "a custom-designed diamond and platinum ring with a divided diamond band". The couple held a celebration on the royal yacht Britannia prior to the wedding.

The wedding was held on 30 July 2011 at the Canongate Kirk in Edinburgh, Scotland, with 400 guests in attendance. The marriage was officiated by the Reverend Neil Gardner. Her off-the-rack ivory silk dress designed by Stewart Parvin featured "a chevron-pleated bodice, a dropped waist, and a 'cathedral-length' train". The Meander Tiara was lent to her and secured the veil. Dolly Maude was her maid of honour, with her paternal half-sister, Stephanie, among the bridesmaids. A reception was held at Holyrood Palace following the service.

The Tindalls resided in a £1.2 million home in Cheltenham, Gloucestershire, before moving onto the Gatcombe Park estate near Minchinhampton. The couple's home, Aston Farm, is a seven-bedroom farmhouse next to the Gatcombe Park estate. Tindall gave birth to a daughter, Mia Grace, on 17 January 2014 at Gloucestershire Royal Hospital, who is 21st in the line of succession. Mia was christened on 30 November 2014 at St Nicholas Church in the village of Cherington. Her next two pregnancies ended in miscarriage. Their second daughter, Lena Elizabeth, was born on 18 June 2018 at the Stroud Maternity Hospital, and is 22nd in the line of succession. Her christening was held at St Nicholas Church in March 2019. Their third child, son Lucas Philip, was born on 21 March 2021 at the family home in Gatcombe Park, and is 23rd in the line of succession. Lucas was christened at Royal Chapel of All Saints, Windsor Park, on 21 November 2021, alongside his second cousin, August Brooksbank. Tindall is godmother to Prince George of Wales, the son of her cousin William, Prince of Wales.

In December 2000, Tindall was involved in a severe car crash near Bourton-on-the-Water. In January 2020, she was banned from driving for six months after accumulating 12 points on her licence. It was also announced that the court was fining her "£666 plus costs and a victim surcharge of £151".

Arms

Honours
 6 February 2002: Queen Elizabeth II Golden Jubilee Medal
 6 February 2012: Queen Elizabeth II Diamond Jubilee Medal
 6 February 2022: Queen Elizabeth II Platinum Jubilee Medal

References

External links

 
 

  Zara Tindall

1981 births
Living people
Alumni of the University of Exeter
Anne, Princess Royal
House of Windsor
BBC Sports Personality of the Year winners
British event riders
British female equestrians
British physiotherapists
English Anglicans
English Olympic medallists
English people of Danish descent
English people of German descent
English people of Greek descent
English people of Russian descent
English people of Scottish descent
Equestrians at the 2012 Summer Olympics
Olympic equestrians of Great Britain
Olympic medalists in equestrian
Olympic silver medallists for Great Britain
Medalists at the 2012 Summer Olympics
Members of the Order of the British Empire
People educated at Beaudesert Park School
People educated at Gordonstoun
People educated at Port Regis School
People from Paddington
Royal Olympic medalists
Rugby union players' wives and girlfriends
Sportspeople from Gloucestershire
The Sunday Times Sportswoman of the Year winners